Science Made Stupid: How to Discomprehend the World Around Us is a 1985 book written and illustrated by Tom Weller. The winner of the 1986 Hugo Award for Best Non-Fiction Book, it is a parody of a junior high or high school-level science textbook. Though now out of print, high-resolution scans are available online, as well as an abridged transcription, both of which have been endorsed by Weller. Highlights of the book include a satirical account of the creationism vs. evolution debate and Weller's drawings of fictional prehistoric animals (e.g., the duck-billed mastodon). The style has been compared to Mad magazine.

Weller released a companion volume, Culture Made Stupid (also spelled Cvltvre Made Stvpid), which satirizes literature and the humanities.

References

External links
 Science Made Stupid Library of Congress 84012938
 Science Made Stupid, online with the author's permission

1985 books
Satirical books
Hugo Award for Best Non-Fiction Book winning works
Science textbooks